The 2021 presidential election was held in Portugal on 24 January. The incumbent President, Marcelo Rebelo de Sousa, was reelected for a second term.

The election was held during the COVID-19 pandemic, and Portugal was under a lockdown as of election day.  President Marcelo Rebelo de Sousa was reelected by a landslide, winning 60.7% of the votes. He won every district in the country and all 308 municipalities, a result which happened for the first time ever in Portuguese democracy; he won 3,083 parishes out of 3,092. The election also marked the rise of right-wing candidate André Ventura, leader of CHEGA, who polled 3rd with almost 12% of the votes. In second place, former MEP and Ambassador Ana Gomes was able to win 13% of the votes, the best result ever for a female candidate in a presidential election. The rest of candidates did not receive above 5% each.

Overall turnout in this election fell to 39.3%, a drop of 9 percentage points, mainly due to the automatic registration of overseas voters; this practice increased the number of registered voters to almost 11 million. In Portugal alone, turnout stood at 45.45%, a decrease of 4.6 percentage points when compared to the 2016 election.  This was the lowest drop in turnout in an election with an incumbent running since 1980.

Background
Marcelo Rebelo de Sousa was elected in 2016 with 52% of the votes on the first round. He took the oath of office on 9 March 2016 and has been in cohabitation with Socialist Prime Minister António Costa since then.

In Portugal, the president is the head of state and has mostly ceremonial powers. However, the president does have some political influence, and can dissolve the Parliament of Portugal if a crisis occurs. The president's official residence is the Belém Palace in Lisbon.

Electoral system
Under Portuguese law, a candidate must receive a majority of votes (50% plus one vote) to be elected. If no candidate achieved a majority in the first round, a runoff election (i.e., second round, held between the two candidates who received the most votes in the first round) should be held.

In order to stand for election, each candidate must gather 7,500 signatures of support one month before the election and submit them to the Constitutional Court of Portugal. The Constitutional Court then certifies the candidacies which meet the requirements to appear on the ballot. The highest number of candidacies ever accepted was ten in 2016.

Early voting
Voters were also able to vote early, which would happen one week before election day on 17 January 2021. Voters had to register between 10 and 14 January in order to be eligible to cast an early ballot; a total of 246,880 voters requested to vote early in 2021.  On January 17, 197,903 voters (80.16% of voters that registered) cast an early ballot.

Candidates

There were seven candidates certified to run in this election.  In addition, the Constitutional Court rejected Eduardo Baptista's nomination due to insufficient signatures, although his name still appeared on the ballot.  Six more individuals had announced their intention to run for President, but did not present any application to the Court, two of whom publicly stated that they would withdraw.  Finally, three more individuals were, for a while, thought of as potential candidates, but later refused to participate.

Formalized candidacy
Ana Gomes, diplomat and former Socialist Party MEP (2004–2019);
André Ventura, CHEGA (CH) leader;
João Ferreira, Portuguese Communist Party (PCP) candidate, MEP since 2009;
Marcelo Rebelo de Sousa, President of the Republic since 2016;
Marisa Matias, Left Bloc (BE) MEP (since 2009); presidential candidate in 2016, polled third place with 10% of the votes;
Tiago Mayan Gonçalves, Liberal Initiative (IL) candidate;
Vitorino Silva (Tino de Rans), React, Include, Recycle (RIR) leader; presidential candidate in 2016, polled 6th place with 3.3% of the votes;

Rejected candidates
Eduardo Baptista, NATO Staff Officer, Independent;

Unsuccessful candidates
Carla Bastos, Socialist Party member, Finances inspector;
Orlando Cruz, former People's Party member;
Paulo Alves, Together for the People party member, former member of the Felgueiras municipal assembly (2005-2009) 
Paulo Patinha Antão, unemployed

Withdrew
Bruno Fialho, Democratic Republican Party (PDR) leader;
Gonçalo da Câmara Pereira, People's Monarchist Party (PPM) president, fado singer, actor and rural producer

Refused
Adolfo Mesquita Nunes, former Secretary of State for Tourism (2013–2015) and People's Party MP (2011–2013).
António Sampaio da Nóvoa, former Rector of the University of Lisbon (2006–2013); presidential candidate in 2016, polled second place with almost 23% of the vote;
Miguel Albuquerque, President of the Regional Government of Madeira since 2015; former Mayor of Funchal (1994–2013).

Campaign

Candidates' slogans

Candidates' debates

Opinion polling

Results

|-
!style="background-color:#E9E9E9;text-align:left;" colspan="2" rowspan="2"|Candidates 
!style="background-color:#E9E9E9;text-align:left;" rowspan="2"|Supporting parties 	
!style="background-color:#E9E9E9;text-align:right;" colspan="2"|First round
|-
!style="background-color:#E9E9E9;text-align:right;"|Votes
!style="background-color:#E9E9E9;text-align:right;"|%
|-
|style="width: 10px" bgcolor=#FF9900 align="center" | 
|align=left|Marcelo Rebelo de Sousa
|align=left|Social Democratic Party, People's Party
|align="right" |2,531,692
|align="right" |60.66
|-
|style="width: 5px" bgcolor=#FF66FF align="center" | 
|align=left|Ana Gomes
|align=left|People–Animals–Nature, LIVRE
|align="right" |540,823
|align="right" |12.96
|-
|style="width: 5px" bgcolor=#202056 align="center" | 
|align=left|André Ventura
|align=left|CHEGA
|align="right" |497,746
|align="right" |11.93
|-
|style="width: 5px" bgcolor=red align="center" | 
|align=left|João Ferreira
|align=left|Portuguese Communist Party, Ecologist Party "The Greens"
|align="right" |179,764
|align="right" |4.31
|-
|style="width: 5px" bgcolor= align="center" | 
|align=left|Marisa Matias
|align=left|Left Bloc, Socialist Alternative Movement
|align="right" |165,127
|align="right" |3.96
|-
|style="width: 5px" bgcolor=#00ADEF align="center" | 
|align=left|Tiago Mayan Gonçalves
|align=left|Liberal Initiative
|align="right" |134,991
|align="right" |3.23
|-
|style="width: 5px" bgcolor=LightSeaGreen align="center" | 
|align=left|Vitorino Silva
|align=left|React, Include, Recycle
|align="right" |123,031
|align="right" |2.95
|-
|colspan="3" align=left style="background-color:#E9E9E9"|Total valid
|width="65" align="right" style="background-color:#E9E9E9"|4,173,174
|width="40" align="right" style="background-color:#E9E9E9"|100.00
|-
|align=right colspan="3"|Blank ballots
|width="65" align="right" |47,164
|width="40" align="right" |1.11
|-
|align=right colspan="3" |Invalid ballots
|width="65" align="right"|38,018
|width="40" align="right"|0.89
|-
|colspan="3" align=left style="background-color:#E9E9E9"|Total
|width="65" align="right" style="background-color:#E9E9E9"|4,258,356
|width="40" align="right" style="background-color:#E9E9E9"|
|-
|colspan=3|Registered voters/turnout
||10,847,434||39.26
|-
|colspan=5 align=left|Source: Comissão Nacional de Eleições
|}

Accomplishments
Marcelo Rebelo de Sousa won the third highest vote margin ever in presidential elections in Portugal since democracy was restored, only behind Mário Soares' 70.35% in 1991 and António Ramalho Eanes' 61.59% in 1976.  He was also the first candidate ever to win the vote in all municipalities.

Ana Gomes became the most voted woman ever in presidential elections in Portugal, beating Marisa Matias' previous record of 10.12% in 2016, and the first to get second place.

Maps

See also
President of Portugal
Politics of Portugal

Notes

References

External links
Official results site, Portuguese Justice Ministry
Portuguese Electoral Commission
ERC – Official publication of polls

Presidential
January 2021 events in Portugal
2021